Jordan Barnett is the name of:

Jordan Barnett (basketball) (born 1995), American basketball player
Jordan Barnett (footballer) (born 1999), English footballer